Mykola Olkesandrovych Levchenko (born October 16, 1979, Donetsk) is the Ukrainian politician, People's Deputy of Ukraine of the 7th convocation, Candidate of Historical Sciences. Is well known for his statements against conducting of the anti-terrorist operation and for settling the conflict in Donbas peacefully. Since 2016 is the Head of the international fund "Donbas without weapons".

Biography

Early years 
Nikolai Levchenko was born on October 16, 1979, in the city of Donetsk. In 1996, he enrolled at Donetsk National University, the faculty of History, and graduated from it in 2001 with “international relations” degree. In 2000 to receive a second degree entered the Donetsk Institute of Internal Affairs, faculty of law, and graduated from it in 2003. The same year successfully defended the candidate dissertation in history. After graduation from the faculty of History of Donetsk National University in 2001 worked as a history teacher in high school #72 in Donetsk.

State activity 
 In 1998, Levchenko was elected a deputy of the Kuibyshev District Council in Donetsk.
 In October 2001, was elected as the First Vice-chairman of the Donetsk Regional Organization “Regions Youth Union”.
 In March 2001, was elected a deputy of the Donetsk City Council.
 Since February 2003, has worked in Donetsk City Council as the Head of Public Relations Office.
 From 2004 to 2010, was elected the Secretary of the Donetsk City Council of the 4th, 5th, 6th convocations.
 In 2008, was elected the vice-chairman of the Donetsk Regional Organization the Party of Regions.
 From 2012 to 2014 was People's Deputy of Ukraine of the 7th convocation. The Chairman of the parliamentary subcommittee on amendments to the Constitution of Ukraine and the Constitution of the Autonomous Republic of Crimea, constitutional legislation.
 In 2014, was Chairman of the Donetsk Regional Organization the Party of Regions. As a People's Deputy of Ukraine has submit to the Parliament a set of bills aimed at decentralization of authority and at extension of powers of local government bodies.

Family status 

He is married with five children.

Well-known statements 
Before the escalation of the conflict in Donbas has initiated the Congress of deputies of all levels “Donbas without weapons” where has insisted on peaceful resolutions to all the issues.

"Those calling for Donbas to withdraw from Ukraine I’d like to answer that it’s like to throw yourself from the 10th floor if you are not satisfy with the HMO’s services. Jump out of the window is the simplest and the swiftest way to solve the problem. But what awaits us at the end of this falling? If we are not satisfied with the rules of life in this house we should stay in the house entitled Ukraine and force to restore order that is acceptable to all citizens, to all residents of Donetsk region".

On 22 July 2014 following the vote on the presidential decree on partial mobilization made a statement: “Today we understood that authority will continue to kill Ukrainians”. In response to this Levchenko switched off the microphone. Parliamentary speaker Oleksandr Turchynov urged “the fifth column that serves Putin” to stop provocations. Thereafter a fight ensued and the issue about removal Levchenko from the conference room was set out.

References

1979 births
Living people
Party of Regions politicians
Politicians from Donetsk
Seventh convocation members of the Verkhovna Rada